Sally Stewart Ronk (August 28, 1912 – December 28, 1986) was an American economist who headed the office of debt analysis of the United States Department of the Treasury.

Life
Ronk was born on August 28, 1912 in Newtonville, Massachusetts,
the daughter of Army officer Gilbert Henry Stewart and his wife Elizabeth Barnard Stewart.

She earned a bachelor's degree at Smith College in 1934, and went to New York University for graduate study in economics, at NYU's Graduate School of Business Administration, earning both a Master of Business Administration and a Ph.D. there.

After working as an economist for the Federal Deposit Insurance Corporation
she moved to Bankers Trust in New York City. She worked for Bankers Trust from 1945 to 1970, becoming a vice president in 1968. Next, she worked for Drexel Firestone as chief economist and vice president from 1970 to 1974. She joined the US Treasury Department in 1974, and retired in 1985.

In her retirement, she returned to New York, where she died on December 28, 1986.

Recognition
Ronk was elected as a Fellow of the American Statistical Association in 1976. She was awarded the Smith College Medal in 1979.

References

1912 births
1986 deaths
American economists
American women economists
Smith College alumni
New York University alumni
Fellows of the American Statistical Association
People from Newton, Massachusetts
20th-century American women